James Joseph O'Connell (February 11, 1901 – November 11, 1976) was an outfielder in Major League Baseball.

Biography
O'Connell was born in Sacramento, California. He started his professional baseball career in the Pacific Coast League at the age of 18. Playing for the San Francisco Seals, O'Connell batted over .330 in 1921 and 1922; he was then purchased by the New York Giants for $75,000 ($ in current dollar terms). He served as a backup outfielder for the Giants in 1923 and 1924.

In the final series of the 1924 season, the Giants were playing the Philadelphia Phillies at the Polo Grounds and battling for the pennant with the Brooklyn Dodgers. O'Connell offered Phillies shortstop Heinie Sand $500 to throw the games ($ in current dollar terms). Sand rejected the bribe and reported it to Phillies manager Art Fletcher. It eventually led to the life-time suspension of O'Connell and Giants coach Cozy Dolan by Commissioner Landis, although future-Hall of Famers Frankie Frisch, George Kelly, and Ross Youngs were also implicated.

In 139 games over two seasons, O"Connell posted a .270 batting average (96-for-356) with 66 runs, 8 home runs, 57 RBIs and 45 bases on balls. Defensively, he recorded a .974 fielding percentage.

See also
 List of people banned from Major League Baseball

References

External links

1901 births
1976 deaths
Major League Baseball center fielders
New York Giants (NL) players
San Francisco Seals (baseball) players
Baseball players from Sacramento, California